Kilraghts is a civil parish and townland (of 424 acres) in County Antrim, Northern Ireland. It is situated in the historic barony of Dunluce Upper.

Townlands
Kilraghts civil parish contains the following townlands:

Artiferrall
Ballylough
Carnageeragh
Crosstagherty
Drumaqueran
Drumbest
Dungorbery
Ganaby
Islandmore
Kilmoyangey
Kilraghts
Knockanavary
Legacurry
Lisboy
Magheraboy Lower
Magheraboy Upper
Smallquarter
Toberbilly

See also
List of civil parishes of County Antrim

References

 
Townlands of County Antrim